In the U.S. state of Arizona, Interstate 10 (I‑10), the major east–west Interstate Highway in the United States Sun Belt, runs east from California, enters Arizona near the town of Ehrenberg and continues through Phoenix and Tucson and exits at the border with New Mexico near San Simon. The highway also runs through the cities of Casa Grande, Eloy, and Marana. Segments of the highway are referred to as either the Papago Freeway, Inner Loop, or Maricopa Freeway within the Phoenix area and the Pearl Harbor Memorial Highway outside metro Phoenix.

Route description 
I-10 through Arizona is designated a "Purple Heart Trail", after those wounded in combat who receive the Purple Heart. The western terminus is located at the California border at the Colorado River in La Paz County where I-10 continues westward into California towards Los Angeles. Here, the same physical road is signed as both I‑10 and U.S. Route 95 (US 95).

Western segment
The highway runs east by northeast through Ehrenberg, the Dome Rock Mountains, and Quartzsite and then turns to an east by southeast orientation just before the junction for US 60. It continues this path entering Maricopa County and the Phoenix Metro area. The route turns east by northeast again at the junction for State Route 85 (SR 85) northwest of downtown Buckeye, and turns due east at Verrado Way (exit 120). The landscape by this point is largely urban.

Papago Freeway
From there, I-10 traverses through the communities of Goodyear, Avondale, and Tolleson, meeting with local streets and area freeways such as Loop 303 (at the former Cotton Lane interchange, exit 124) and the Loop 101 Agua Fria Freeway along the way. By December 2019, the simple diamond interchange with 59th Avenue (exit 138) was totally rebuilt, transforming it into the first of two junctions with the Loop 202 Ed Pastor Freeway. As it makes its way through Phoenix, the highway meets with I‑17 and US 60 for the first time just northwest of downtown at The Stack.

Inner Loop
East of The Stack, I-10 forms the north edge of downtown. Near 3rd Avenue, the highway enters a half-mile tunnel that runs under a park and the central branch of the City of Phoenix Library. Emerging past 3rd Street, the highway continues due eastward for another  before coming to another interchange for Route 51 and Loop 202 (second of three junctions with the latter), called the Mini Stack. Here, I‑17 terminates as I‑10 skews eastward again. After this junction, the highway is cosigned with US 60.

Maricopa Freeway
Continuing southeast over the Salt River and eastward, I‑10 and US 60 enter Tempe and meets with SR 143. Then, at the Broadway Curve, the freeway turns southward again, with US 60 splitting off to become its own freeway. I‑10 continues southward running along the city borders of Phoenix on the west, and Tempe, Guadalupe, Tempe again, and finally Chandler on the east. Immediately north of the Gila River Indian Community, I‑10 has its third and final intersection with Loop 202. Past Loop 202, the highway turns to a more south by southeast direction going through the Gila River Indian Community and entering Pinal County.

Broadway Curve
As of a 2006 estimate, the Broadway Curve portion of I‑10 in Tempe carries an average of 294,000 vehicles per day. This number is predicted to increase by over 150,000 to approximately 450,000 by 2025. This section of I‑10 is currently twelve lanes wide, and is the widest section of freeway in the valley. Construction is underway (as of July 2021) to widen the Broadway Curve area.

Eastern segment
After exiting the Phoenix metropolitan area, I‑10 continues southward into Casa Grande intersecting I‑8 before heading southeast towards Tucson, paralleling the Santa Cruz River. Several projects have occurred recently, including construction of a new exit at Twin Peaks Rd in Marana and widening of I‑10 from Prince Rd to I-19 in Tucson to four lanes in each direction, which was later extended to Ruthrauff Rd/El Camino Del Cerro. After I-10's junction with I-19, I-10 heads southeast towards Benson and Willcox before entering New Mexico.

History

I‑10 in Arizona was laid out by the Arizona Highway Department in 1956–1958 roughly paralleling several historic routes across the state. Particularly east of Eloy, it follows the Butterfield Stage and Pony Express routes, and loops south to avoid the north–south Basin and Range mountains prevalent in the state. In fact, the route from its junction with I‑8 east to New Mexico is almost exactly the same route used by the old horse-drawn stagecoaches, which had to go from waterhole to waterhole and avoid the hostile Apache Indians. This is why I-10 is more of a north–south route between Phoenix and Tucson than east–west. The Southern Pacific Sunset Route line had to take the route of least hills, and in the 1920s highways were laid down next to the trains across southern Arizona.

When the project was being designed in the 1950s, the Arizona Highway Department fought for a nearly straight-shot west from Phoenix for the new freeway, instead of angling northwest out of Phoenix along US 60/US 70/US 89, through Wickenburg. Wickenburgers battled to bring the freeway through their city but lost that battle. The detour up through Wickenburg was logical decades earlier, when nearly all U.S. highways through Arizona were laid out along railroad tracks, and US 60/US 70 was routed mostly parallel to the Santa Fe rail tracks east of Wickenburg, and the Arizona and California Railway west to Vicksburg. The two old federal routes then struck west across the desert and state line, picking up the Southern Pacific mainline at Indio, California, and I-10 overlies the old roads most of that distance.

West of Phoenix

In 1960, this westernmost stretch of I-10 was built from near the Colorado River east to the future spot where the "Brenda Cutoff" section of I-10 would connect a decade later. Until the early 1970s, this was the last freeway stretch until Phoenix. The "Brenda Cutoff" was named for a gas station on the old road just east of the fork where US 60 now terminates at I-10. Now an obscure name, "Brenda Cutoff" was the working title that the Arizona Highway Department called the stretch of freeway from US 60 to near Buckeye. The Brenda Cutoff paralleled old sand roads used in the 1920s for Phoenix-Los Angeles traffic, but mostly abandoned after US 60/US 70 was built to the north, through Wickenburg.

The Brenda Cutoff's opening on June 18, 1973 was eagerly awaited and was a big deal in newspapers in Phoenix and Los Angeles. But the freeway was opened only as far east as Tonopah, and heavy traffic was routed down narrow county roads through the desert and fields between Tonopah and Buckeye. In addition, there was only one very-small gas station on the very-long route between Buckeye and Quartzsite, on the old county road at the tiny crossroads of Palo Verde. Signs warning "No Services Next 106 Miles" were posted at either end of the Brenda Cutoff those first few years.

The freeway was extended past Tonopah as far east as Phoenix's western fringes (at Cotton Lane) in about 1974. I-10's freeway section ended in Goodyear until the controversial Papago Freeway was finished across the western Valley of the Sun in 1990. During the "west valley gap" years, westbound I-10 traffic was routed off the Maricopa Freeway at 19th Avenue in Phoenix, and stayed on the access road as it curved past the Durango Curve. Los Angeles-bound traffic then turned left on Buckeye Road and followed the "TO 10" signs down Buckeye Road (first marked US 80 until 1977, then SR 85) for nearly 15 years.

Phoenix metropolitan area
The interstate's route through Phoenix was hotly contested in the 1960s, 1970s, and early 1980s. A plan proposed by the Arizona Department of Transportation involved monstrous block-sized 270-degree "helicoil" interchanges at Third Avenue and Third Street that would connect motorists to freeway lanes  in the air, but voters killed it in 1973 as a result of opposition from the Arizona Republic newspaper and a growing nationwide anti-freeway sentiment. Voters on election day were treated to a photo depiction on the front page of the newspaper that in later years was shown to have drastically overstated the freeway's height, but there is no question the proposed viaducts and helicoils would have been a visual gash across central Phoenix.

This stub was originally designated I-510. The Inner Loop name was given to it in 1969, at which time the highway changed numbers, to I-410. The I-10/I-510 interchange was the first multilevel interchange in Arizona and lasted until the Inner Loop was built as a real freeway in the 1980s. This putative freeway was two lanes in each direction and would have been hopelessly inadequate as a leg of the Inner Loop as it was intended.

After 1973, Arizona engineers favored a more-modest plan to link I-10 with I‑17 at the "Durango Curve" near 19th Avenue at Buckeye Road, and avoid the "Moreland Corridor" alignment of the Papago Freeway by adopting a route south of Buckeye Rd. In 1983, ADOT unveiled the current below grade plans on Moreland Street, three blocks south of McDowell Road. The state is now considering a reliever freeway in West Phoenix, parallel to I-10 on the old Durango Street corridor, and was originally designated as Route 801, which has since been changed to SR 30.

The original 1962 alignment of I-10 through Phoenix was on the Black Canyon and Maricopa Freeways, now signed as I-17 and US 60, starting at about Grand Avenue. From 1962 to 1974, I‑10 in Phoenix ended at 40th Street, and truck traffic through Phoenix and Mesa was directed to use Arizona Route T-69 via 40th Street south and Baseline Road east to connect to SR 87 and SR 93, the shortcuts to Tucson. The I-10 signs were moved from the Maricopa Freeway to the Papago Freeway/Inner Loop alignments when it opened in 1990—the last gap of I-10 to be completed between Santa Monica and Jacksonville. This was the only time in Arizona where the posted freeway was moved from one road to another: the state never posted interstate signs on older state or U.S. highways. ADOT instead made frequent use of interstate shields with the word "TO" above and arrows below the shield.

For several years in the early 1970s, an orphan section of I-10 was opened between Baseline Road and Williams Field Road (now Chandler Blvd.) but was not marked as any highway, nor was it connected to the rest of the Interstate Highway System. ADOT, it seems, did not want to divert trucks down from T-69 in Guadalupe down into the cotton fields west of Chandler. This section got its interstate signs when the freeway south to Tucson was completed in about 1970, and the "Broadway Curve" was connected a year or so later—for almost two years, I-10 traffic used Baseline Road and 40th Street through the Japanese flower gardens until the last link between Tucson and Phoenix opened in about 1972.

From 1958 to 1972, the interstate was unmarked south from Tempe and Mesa, and traffic used either SR 87 through Coolidge or SR 93 through Casa Grande, or US 80/US 89 through Mesa and Florence. I‑10 signs reappeared at the town of Picacho, the 1962–1970 western terminus of the freeway from Tucson.

This included a new HOV lane from Dysart Road (exit 129) to Loop 101, later adding a HOV lane from Estrella Pkwy (exit 126) to Dysart Road. From Estrella Pkwy to Verrado Way, an additional lane was added.

New interchanges have been added, whereas Citrus Road has a new exit at 123, Sarival Avenue has a new exit at 125, and Fairway Drive has a new exit at 130.

Southeast of Phoenix

The road from Casa Grande to Tucson was originally SR 84 and SR 93, and when it was rebuilt as a freeway in 1961–1962 it was cosigned as I‑10 and routes 84 and 93 through 1966, when 84 was truncated at Picacho. This section of interstate was completed in 1961, and forced the demolition of the town center at Marana. The freeway through Tucson, which was rebuilt and widened in stages from 1989 to 2014, with frontage roads added, was originally signed as SR 84 from Miracle Mile to Sixth Avenue.

The original highway from Casa Grande to Tucson entered the Old Pueblo via Miracle Mile, a road modeled after German Autobahns but without overpasses or an exclusive right of way. Traffic circles at either end of Miracle Mile were the best Tucson could come up with in 1937. The section of Miracle Mile West stretching between Miracle Mile and the Southern Pacific overpass was signed as Business Loop 10, SR 84, and SR 93 in the 1960s. It is now marked as the southern leg on SR 77, the new designation for US 80/US 89 north out of Tucson. The Business Loop designation was dropped in 1998.

The present-day I‑10 alignment along the Santa Cruz River was laid out after a city bond issue passed in 1948 to build a riverbank-side boulevard with room for a four-lane freeway in the median to follow. The route was originally called the Tucson Limited Access Highway and the Tucson Freeway. Construction on the bypass began on December 27, 1950. The first section of bypass artery, from Congress Street north to Miracle Mile West, was opened on December 20, 1951 but had no overpasses or interchanges at Grant Road (then DeMoss-Petrie Road), Speedway Boulevard or St. Mary's Road. It was first signed SR 84A. The remainder of the route was finished by 1956 to a new cloverleaf interchange at Sixth Avenue (then US 80 and US 89). In 1958, the state added the bypass to the Interstate Highway System as part of I-10 and began converting it to full freeway standards. The freeway was finally completed in 1961, and parts of it obliterated the original road. The SR 84A designation was entirely concurrent with I-10 between Sixth Avenue and Miracle Mile until October 11, 1963, when the designation was finally retired in favor of I-10.

The old cloverleaf at Sixth Avenue was the first built in Arizona, opening in the early 1950s as a southern Tucson gateway junction to the roads linking Tucson, Benson, Nogales, and the hoped-for Tucson bypass along the Santa Cruz River. It was converted to a diamond interchange by 1964 and the old "quick dip" underpass was removed and replaced by an interstate-standard overpass in the late 1980s.

Although the controversial I‑10 route across Phoenix was the last gap of I‑10 to be completed, two pieces of the interstate were subsequently left sitting on divided remnants of old US 80 and were neither built to interstate nor modern safety standards. One was the old Sixth Avenue interchange, and a small section of freeway east to the overpass over the old Southern Pacific (now Union Pacific) spur to Nogales and Guaymas. That section was replaced about 1990.

The last section of old US 80 that carried the I‑10 traffic was an underpass beneath the Union Pacific mainline east of Tucson, where the freeway median shrank to a guardrail at Marsh Station Road and the Pantano railroad overpass was too low. This underpass and section of former US 80 was originally constructed between 1952 and 1955 to replace the older more dangerous route over the 1921 Ciénega Bridge. The Marsh Station Road interchange was replaced in 2011, with the railroad mainline rerouted in 2012 and the railroad overpass removed in 2013. The remainder of the old US 80 section was rebuilt to interstate standards, with completion in 2014.

East of Tucson, I‑10 parallels and, in some cases, overlies old US 80 to Benson, and was originally cosigned as US 80 and SR 86. The section of I-10 from Valencia Road to Rita Road was the first construction project in the state of Arizona funded by the Federal Aid Highway Act of 1956. Construction began in 1957 and was completed in 1960. From Benson, the interstate follows the Southern Pacific mainline east through Willcox and Bowie to New Mexico, rather than bend south to the Mexican border along old US 80 (signed as SR 80 after 1989), through Douglas. The road from Benson east through Willcox was designated SR 86 in about 1935, that route number was subsequently shifted west and exists now between Why and Tucson. The bypass around Benson was opened about 1979, and other than the Phoenix gap was the last section of I‑10 to be opened.

Future
Construction is planned for the  segment from Loop 202 (Santan Freeway) in Chandler to SR 387 near Casa Grande. A third lane will be added in each direction along with improvements to several interchanges, crossroads and bridges. An HOV lane will be constructed for the  segment from Loop 202 to Riggs Road. Construction was originally planned to begin in 2025 but was sped up to begin in 2023 when Governor Doug Ducey signed a bill allocating funds for this project. It is planned to be completed in 2026.

HOV lane connections are planned to be constructed at the Loop 101 interchange in Tolleson. Construction is planned to begin in 2025 and be completed in 2027.

Exit list

References

External links

 Interstate 10 - Arizona (AARoads.com)
 Papago Freeway at arizonaroads.com

010
10
 Arizona
1010
Transportation in La Paz County, Arizona
Transportation in Maricopa County, Arizona
Transportation in Pinal County, Arizona
Transportation in Pima County, Arizona
Transportation in Cochise County, Arizona